Agustina Jacobi (born April 27, 1986) is an Argentine Art Director. Before moving to New York, she worked at Diseño Cronico and Cris Morena Group, a worldwide renowned TV and theatre Production Company based in Buenos Aires as well as Pierini Partners, an also worldwide renowned packaging design studio.

Notable work

Axe Twist: packaging (at Pierini Partners)
Rexona Latam: packaging (at Pierini Partners)
Casi Ángeles – Teen Angels: Senior Designer
Jake & Blake: Senior Designer
Supertorpe (Superclumsy): Senior Designer
AAMNBA (National Museum of Fine Arts Association, Buenos Aires)
Vinos del Norte: design consulting (2010-2014)
Residencia Sophia: Art Director
Grupo Almar: packaging design
Especially Puglia: Multimedia designer
Casa Mia: Art Director ¬– branding and packaging design
OpenBCI: Art Director prior to and during a successful kickstarter campaign (which raised $215,438).
Manhattan Short Film festival: Art Director
Termica San Luis: Art Director – branding and website design, and interactive video.
Face: Project Lead
Harley-Davidson Annual Dealer Meeting 2014: Multimedia Designer (at Proscenium)
TD Ameritrade Leadership Summit 2014" Art Director (at Proscenium)
Harley-Davidson Annual Dealer Meeting 2015: Multimedia Designer (at Proscenium)
TD Ameritrade National Advisor Conference 2015" Art Director (at Proscenium)
Heineken USA Employee Meeting 2015: Art Director (at Proscenium)
Harley-Davidson Annual Dealer Meeting 2016: Multimedia Designer (at Proscenium)
TD Ameritrade National Advisor Conference 2016" Art Director (at Proscenium)
Heineken USA National Distributors Conference March 2016:Art Director (at Proscenium)
Heineken USA National Distributors Conference October 2016:Art Director (at Proscenium)
TD Ameritrade National Advisor Conference 2017" Art Director (at Proscenium)

Awards

Universidad de Palermo (Buenos Aires, Argentina)
Design and Communication Faculty
Prize: Real Projects For Real Clients, 2009
“Signage System and Branding Design for The Historic Heritage from Buenos Aires Zoo”
Category: Tridimensional Design II, Graphic Design
Third Prize

Universidad de Palermo (Buenos Aires, Argentina)
Design and Communication Faculty
Prize: Santander Rio Bank 2008
Category: Web Campaign Project, Graphic Design
First Prize

Universidad de Palermo (Buenos Aires, Argentina)
Design and Communication Faculty
Contest 2006/2
Young Culture: Cultural Magazine
Category: Studio IV (Editorial Design)
First Prize

References

External links
 "Parsons MFA D+T - Face"
 "Personal Website"
 "Diseño Crónico"
 
 
 
 "The Art of Stop Motion". Parsons MFA D+T.

Living people
Argentine artists
1986 births